Loughborough Rugby Football Club is a rugby union club in Loughborough, United Kingdom that has been in existence since 1929. The club has over 300 players and supported by over 50 volunteers. It has a large minis and juniors section, 2 regular men's teams playing on Saturdays and a women's team that play in the Championship North league (2nd tier) on Sundays.

History

In 1929 a handful of players, met and decided to form the club. The club was and still is a Rugby Union football club, the game of rugby having grown to be very distinct from what we now know as association football (soccer).

Loughborough regularly fields four men's sides on a Saturday, as well as having one of the best attended Mini and Junior sections in the county. Loughborough RFC is affiliated to the Leicestershire Rugby Union (LRU), the Rugby Football Union and the Rugby Football Union for Women. The club now plays its matches on Derby Road Playing Fields and has its own purpose built clubhouse, six changing rooms and four pitches.

The 1st XV played league fixtures in Midlands 1 East for the first time in the 2011-12 Season. In the 2010–11 season Loughborough finished second in Midlands 2 East (North), winning a promotion play-off against Peterborough Lions to gain promotion. The club managed to build on the success of the previous year and stayed in Midlands 1 East for another season, finishing . Andrew York stays on for a second term as 1st XV Captain, while Chris Campbell is continuing as head coach and Jason Button has been signed as Director of Rugby.

The club has reached the final of the Leicestershire County Bowl, beating Vipers RFC two years in succession to lift the trophy. (Oddly enough, the 'Bowl' is actually a cup. This should not be seen as being too odd though as when Loughborough won the Leicestershire County Plate, the plate was in fact a shield.) This season Loughborough's attempt to lift the trophy for a third successive year was thwarted by Leicester Forest, a close and hard-fought game ending with a 12-10 victory for the Leicester outfit.

Women's and youth teams
Loughborough, as many clubs have done, has responded to the calling and popularity of Women's Rugby and the Women's XV. The club uses the excellent Training facilities on offer at the University in the week and plays its matches at Derby Road on Sunday afternoons. The Women's team work in partnership with Loughborough Lightning creating a player pathway to the premiership and provide more opportunities for players, including Loughborough University students.

The team currently play in the Championship North since their Midlands win in 2013/14 season.

2012/13 season saw the Loughborough 1st XV won the Midlands One league title from Olney in a 'winner takes all' finale match at Derby Road, and from there progressed to a Northern Play-Off against Altrincham Kersal. Loughborough played their opponents off the park in a 29-7 win, and secured promotion to Level 2 of the women's game, Championship North 1. This promotion was the first time Loughborough had achieved a League title since they won four consecutive League Championships from 2001-2004. The Women's XV have also previously reached the final of the RFUW North Cup and the RFUW National Shield, RFUW Super 4 competition and regularly see players in the Leicestershire County representative senior team.

Loughborough also has a hugely successful youth set-up, including Mini-Midi rugby for those children (boys and girls) aged 7 to 12. Junior rugby is for boys aged between 13 and 17. Colts rugby is for those aged 18 and 19. It is hoped that the women's section will be able to add a Junior Girls section in the near future (age groups under 14 and under 17).

Loughborough is always open to new members, both players and social members, and encourages boys, girls, men and women to join the club, either as players or Social Members.

Veterans Team
Under the leadership of ex-First Team Captain, Andrew York, a hardy band of old-timers regularly take to the pitch and have surprised themselves just how much they have aged in recent years.

On 18 April 2015 the club will play host to the "Beer Tap" Veterans Rugby Tournament.  16 Teams from around the UK, competing to discover who is the least slow.

Club honours
Midlands 2 East (north v south) promotion playoff winners: 2010–11

External links
 The Official Loughborough RFC website
 The Loughborough RFC Veterans website

English rugby union teams
Rugby union clubs in Leicestershire
Rugby clubs established in 1921
Sport in Loughborough
Women's rugby union teams in England
1921 establishments in England